The Djibouti Youth Movement was a militant organization which claimed responsibility for two grenade attacks in Djibouti on 27 September 1990. This event was the first international public exposure of the organization.

The first attack on the Café de Paris killed one French boy and wounded 15 French adults. During the second attack, on the Café L’Historil, the grenades failed to explode and there were no casualties.

Sources 

 Chronology of Significant Terrorist Events, 1961-2005. Berkshire Publishing Group.

Rebel groups in Djibouti
Terrorism in Djibouti
Defunct organizations designated as terrorist in Africa
1990s in Djibouti